The 2017–18 Iowa Hawkeyes women's basketball team represented the University of Iowa during the 2017–18 NCAA Division I women's basketball season. The Hawkeyes, led by 18th year head coach Lisa Bluder, played their home games at Carver–Hawkeye Arena in Iowa City, IA as members of the Big Ten Conference. They finished the season 24–8, 11–5 in Big Ten play to finish in a three-way tie for third place. They defeated Northwestern in the second round before losing to Minnesota in the quarterfinals of the Big Ten women's tournament. They received an at-large bid to the NCAA women's tournament as the No. 6 seed in the Kansas City region. There they lost in the First Round to Creighton.

Previous season 
The Hawkeyes finished the 2016–17 season 20–14, 8–8 in Big Ten play to finish in a tie for eighth place. They lost in the second round of the Big Ten women's tournament to Northwestern. They received an invitation to the Women's National Invitation Tournament where defeated Missouri State, South Dakota, and Colorado before losing to Washington State in the NIT quarterfinals.

Roster

Schedule and results

|-
! colspan="9" style=| Exhibition

|-
! colspan="9" style=| Non-conference regular season

|-

|-

|-

|-

|-

|-

|-

|-

|-

|-

|-

|-

|-
! colspan="9" style=| Big Ten conference season

|-

|-

|-

|-

|-

|-

|-

|-

|-

|-

|-

|-

|-

|-

|-

|-
!colspan="9" style=| Big Ten Women's Tournament

|-
!colspan="9" style=| NCAA Women's Tournament

Source

Rankings

See also
 2017–18 Iowa Hawkeyes men's basketball team

References

Iowa Hawkeyes women's basketball seasons
Iowa
Iowa Hawkeyes
Iowa Hawkeyes
Iowa